Erik Embrich (born February 23, 1997) is a Finnish professional ice hockey forward. He is currently playing for Dunaújvárosi Acélbikák.

Embrich began his career with HIFK's academy from 2012 to 2015 before moving to Ässät. He played eleven games for Ässät during the 2016–17 Liiga season where he registered one assist. On May 2, 2017, Embrich signed a two-way contract with Jokerit of the Kontinental Hockey League. He  would however play just one league game and one playoff game for the team as he spent most of his tenure with their co-operation team, Kiekko-Vantaa of Mestis.

On August 13, 2019, Embrich signed a contract with TUTO Hockey of Mestis. On August 4, 2020, Embrich moved to Slovakia to sign for HC Nové Zámky of the Tipos Extraliga.

Personal life
Embrich is of Estonian descent through his father and Russian descent through his mother. His brother  is also an ice hockey player.

References

External links

1997 births
Living people
Ässät players
Finnish ice hockey forwards
Jokerit players
Kiekko-Vantaa players
HC Nové Zámky players
Ice hockey people from Helsinki
TuTo players
Finnish expatriate ice hockey players in Slovakia
Finnish people of Estonian descent
Finnish people of Russian descent
Finnish expatriate ice hockey players in Hungary
Dunaújvárosi Acélbikák players